Philip of Exon was Archdeacon of Barnstaple until 1279.

References

Archdeacons of Barnstaple